Sankt-Peterburg is a Russian rock band, formed in 1969 in Leningrad. It is one of the oldest rock bands of the USSR. It was the first Soviet rock band to perform a program entirely of their own songs in Russian. At the time, the majority of Soviet rock bands were covering Anglo-American rock songs.

Background
Sankt-Peterburg's lead singer, Vladimir Rekshan, was a pioneer of Russian language rock and roll songwriting in the early 70s. He was also criticized by audiences for singing in Russian. The group was also unfairly accused by propagandists of being monarchists.

References

External links 
 Official Website
   Сайт, посвящённый творчеству группы «Санкт-Петербург»
История группы «Санкт-Петербург» на сетевом издании о рок-музыкe
 Deezer: Vladimir Rekshan and Band "Sankt-Peterburg"

Russian rock music groups
Musical groups from Saint Petersburg
Musical groups established in 1969
1969 establishments in the Soviet Union
Soviet rock music groups